The Aber Wrac'h is a small village and port located on the river Wrac'h in the commune of Landéda in the department of Finistère in France, located in Brittany.

The Wrac'h's source is in Trémaouézan. It travels through Ploudaniel, Le Folgoët, Lannilis and Plouguerneau and enters the ocean in the estuary between the Sainte Marguerite peninsula and the headland of the Virgin Island.

Origin of the name 
The Aber Wrac'h could derive its name from the first immersed rock of its channel, “Ar Wrach”, which means “the old woman” (or the wrasse) in Breton.

An alternative theory is that the name is derived from the “estuary of the fairy” which may be related to the alleged Gallo-Roman bridge located upstream of the river mouth (ruins still visible today) named Pont Krac'h (Bridge of the Devil).

British accounts of the 18th and 19th Century give the town's name as Averach.

History 
The United States Navy established a naval air station on 4 June 1918 to operate seaplanes during World War I. The base closed shortly after the First Armistice at Compiègne.

Islands in the vicinity of Aber Wrac'h 
They following archipelago is also referred to as the islands of Lilia :
 Cézon island and its Fort
 Wrac'h Island
 Stagadon island
 Island of Erch
 Island of the Cross

Recreation 
The town is a popular location and base for sailing, windsurfing and kitesurfing.

External links
 l'Aber Wrac'h, S/V Dalliance

References
 Translated from Aber Wrac'h, French Wikipedia

Villages in Brittany
Populated coastal places in Brittany
Ports and harbours of the English Channel